Jawaharlal Nehru College is located in Pasighat Township in the East Siang district, in the North-Eastern part of Indian state of Arunachal Pradesh.

Basic Information
About the Institution.

References

Universities and colleges in Arunachal Pradesh
Educational institutions established in 1964
Pasighat
1964 establishments in the North-East Frontier Agency